Flip van Lidth de Jeude (born 13 June 1949) is a Dutch field hockey player. He competed in the men's tournament at the 1972 Summer Olympics.

References

External links
 

1949 births
Living people
Dutch male field hockey players
Olympic field hockey players of the Netherlands
Field hockey players at the 1972 Summer Olympics
People from Zeist
Sportspeople from Utrecht (province)
20th-century Dutch people